The Adria Tour was an exhibition tennis tour held in June 2020 in Belgrade, Serbia and Zadar, Croatia. It was organized by the world No. 1 ranked player Novak Djokovic during the ATP Tour's shutdown due to the COVID-19 pandemic.

The event fell under heavy criticism due to its lack of social distancing procedures, and allowing a full crowd, unlike the simultaneous Ultimate Tennis Showdown. A planned Montenegrin leg was cancelled due to COVID-19 concerns. During the Croatian leg, Grigor Dimitrov, one of the marquee players, announced that he had tested positive for the virus, leading to the event being abandoned. Borna Ćorić, Dimitrov's last opponent, tested positive the next day. Viktor Troicki and Djokovic himself tested positive over the next two days.

Tournament
After the ATP announced on 12 March that all tennis events would be suspended for at least six weeks due to the COVID-19 pandemic, Novak Djokovic proposed an exhibition tournament in his home region of the Balkans from 13 June to 5 July.  The schedule and locations proposed were:

 Belgrade, Serbia — 13–14 June
 Zadar, Croatia — 20–21 June
 Montenegro — 27–28 June
 Banja Luka, Bosnia and Herzegovina — 3–4 July
 Sarajevo, Bosnia and Herzegovina — 5 July

Unusually for events during the pandemic, fans were allowed to attend, but organizers said that a one-meter distance between each spectator would be enforced. This was not the case during the Serbian leg, however, which was tightly packed.

Format
The matches proposed were a shorter version of tennis called Fast4 Tennis where the first player to win 4 games wins the set, with 2 sets winning the match. Each stop on the tour followed a round-robin system between players in two pools, with the pool winners playing in a final.

Participants 
The following is a list of players for the tournament:

The singles competitors secured for the event were top players, compared to other unofficial tournaments around the same time.

Finals
In the Belgrade tournament, Dominic Thiem defeated surprise finalist Filip Krajinović in three sets in the first leg. The cancelled final of the second leg was to be between Novak Djokovic and Andrey Rublev.

Aftermath
It was revealed on 21 June that Grigor Dimitrov tested positive for COVID-19 after participating in the Zadar event and then returning to his home in Monaco. The announcement by Dimitrov on Instagram took place shortly before the final was to be played in Zadar, with the crowd awaiting the players to enter the court. After Dimitrov's announcement, the final was cancelled.

Social media posts and photographs of the players showed them hugging, shaking hands, playing basketball, and dancing together during the event, as well as during the previous event a week and a half earlier in Belgrade.

Borna Ćorić, who played against Dimitrov at the Zadar event and was seen to hug Dimitrov before the game, also revealed on 22 June that he tested positive for COVID-19. Viktor Troicki and his pregnant wife Aleksandra announced they had tested positive hours later.

On 23 June, Djokovic announced that both he and his wife Jelena had also tested positive for COVID-19.

On 26 June, Djokovic's coach Goran Ivanišević confirmed that he had tested positive for the virus as well.

See also 
 2020 Novak Djokovic tennis season
 COVID-19 pandemic in Croatia
 COVID-19 pandemic in Serbia

Gallery

References

External links 
 

Novak Djokovic
Clay court tennis tournaments
Sports events curtailed due to the COVID-19 pandemic
June 2020 sports events in Europe
2020 in tennis
2020 in Croatian tennis
2020 in Serbian sport
2020 scandals
COVID-19 pandemic in Croatia
COVID-19 pandemic in Serbia
Exhibition tennis tournaments
Tennis controversies